Moechotypa thoracica is a species of beetle in the family Cerambycidae. It was described by White in 1858. It is known from India, Borneo, Laos, Sumatra, Vietnam, and Java.

References

thoracica
Beetles described in 1858